Kasokero orthonairovirus is a species of virus in the genus Orthonairovirus. Its only known host is the fruit bat Rousettus aegyptiacus. The virus takes its name from the Kasokero Cave in Uganda, where it was first collected.

References

Nairoviridae